Akihiko Matsuda (born 22 June 1965) is a Japanese former volleyball player who competed in the 1992 Summer Olympics.

References

1965 births
Living people
Japanese men's volleyball players
Olympic volleyball players of Japan
Volleyball players at the 1992 Summer Olympics
Asian Games medalists in volleyball
Volleyball players at the 1994 Asian Games
Medalists at the 1994 Asian Games
Asian Games gold medalists for Japan
20th-century Japanese people
21st-century Japanese people